Meryta sonchifolia is a species of plant in the family Araliaceae. It is endemic to New Caledonia.

References

Endemic flora of New Caledonia
sonchifolia
Vulnerable plants
Taxonomy articles created by Polbot